West Mersea Priory was a Benedictine priory in West Mersea, Essex, England. It was founded in 1046 and granted by Edward the Confessor to the Abbey of Saint-Ouen in Rouen. As an alien priory it was taken by Henry V who granted it in 1422 to Henry Chichele, archbishop of Canterbury, for his college at Higham Ferrers. The priory was dissolved in 1542. There are no physical remains.

References

Monasteries in Essex
West Mersea
Benedictine monasteries in England
Alien priories in England